Peter Nienow FRSE is a Professor in glaciology at the University of Edinburgh. His research focuses on how glaciers and ice sheets respond to climate change. He was educated at Leighton Park School and Cambridge University.

He is a winner of the Polar Medal, an award given to British citizens in recognition of acquisition of knowledge about polar regions, and who have undertaken polar expeditions in extreme hardship.

Awards and honours 
In 2019 he was elected a Fellow of the Royal Society of Edinburgh

References

Living people
Year of birth missing (living people)
British glaciologists
Recipients of the Polar Medal
Academics of the University of Edinburgh
British geographers